Yvonne Anna Margaretha Brunen (born 4 February 1971) was a Dutch professional cyclist from Nunspeet, the Netherlands. She turned professional in 1993. She competed in two events at the 1996 Summer Olympics.

Palmarès

1994
1st Dutch National Road Race Championships

1995
1st Dutch National Road Race Championships

1996
1st Dutch National Road Race Championships

1997
1st Dutch National Mountain Bike Championships
2nd Dutch National Road Race Championships

1998
3rd Dutch National Time Trial Championships

1999
3rd Dutch National Mountain Bike Championships
3rd Dutch National Road Race Championships

See also
 List of Dutch Olympic cyclists

References

1971 births
Living people
Dutch female cyclists
People from Nunspeet
UCI Road World Championships cyclists for the Netherlands
Cyclists from Gelderland
Olympic cyclists of the Netherlands
Cyclists at the 1996 Summer Olympics
20th-century Dutch women